In control engineering, a state-space representation is a mathematical model of a physical system specified as a set of input, output and variables related by first-order (not involving second derivatives) differential equations or difference equations. Such variables, called state variables, evolve over time in a way that depends on the values they have at any given instant and on the externally imposed values of input variables. Output variables’ values depend on the values of the state variables.

The state space or phase space is the geometric space in which the variables on the axes are the state variables. The state of the system can be represented as a vector, the state vector, within state space.

If the dynamical system is linear, time-invariant, and finite-dimensional, then the differential and algebraic equations may be written in matrix form.
The state-space method is characterized by significant algebraization of general system theory, which makes it possible to use Kronecker vector-matrix structures. The capacity of these structures can be efficiently applied to research systems with modulation or without it. 
The state-space representation (also known as the "time-domain approach") provides a convenient and compact way to model and analyze systems with multiple inputs and outputs. With  inputs and  outputs, we would otherwise have to write down  Laplace transforms to encode all the information about a system. Unlike the frequency domain approach, the use of the state-space representation is not limited to systems with linear components and zero initial conditions.

The state-space model can be applied in subjects such as economics, statistics, computer science and electrical engineering, and neuroscience. In econometrics, for example, state-space models can be used to decompose a time series into trend and cycle, compose individual indicators into a composite index, identify turning points of the business cycle, and estimate GDP using latent and unobserved time series. Many applications rely on the Kalman Filter to produce estimates of the current unknown state variables using their previous observations.

State variables 
The internal state variables are the smallest possible subset of system variables that can represent the entire state of the system at any given time. The minimum number of state variables required to represent a given system, is usually equal to the order of the system's defining differential equation, but not necessarily. If the system is represented in transfer function form, the minimum number of state variables is equal to the order of the transfer function's denominator after it has been reduced to a proper fraction. It is important to understand that converting a state-space realization to a transfer function form may lose some internal information about the system, and may provide a description of a system which is stable, when the state-space realization is unstable at certain points. In electric circuits, the number of state variables is often, though not always, the same as the number of energy storage elements in the circuit such as capacitors and inductors. The state variables defined must be linearly independent, i.e., no state variable can be written as a linear combination of the other state variables, or the system cannot be solved.

Linear systems 

The most general state-space representation of a linear system with  inputs,  outputs and  state variables is written in the following form:

where:
 is called the "state vector",  ; 
 is called the "output vector",  ; 
 is called the "input (or control) vector",  ; 
 is the "state (or system) matrix",  ,
 is the "input matrix",  ,
 is the "output matrix",  ,
 is the "feedthrough (or feedforward) matrix" (in cases where the system model does not have a direct feedthrough,  is the zero matrix),  ,
 .

In this general formulation, all matrices are allowed to be time-variant (i.e. their elements can depend on time); however, in the common LTI case, matrices will be time invariant. The time variable  can be continuous (e.g. ) or discrete (e.g. ). Hybrid systems allow for time domains that have both continuous and discrete parts. Depending on the assumptions made, the state-space model representation can assume the following forms:

Example: continuous-time LTI case 
Stability and natural response characteristics of a continuous-time LTI system (i.e., linear with matrices that are constant with respect to time) can be studied from the eigenvalues of the matrix . The stability of a time-invariant state-space model can be determined by looking at the system's transfer function in factored form. It will then look something like this:

The roots of this polynomial (the eigenvalues) are the system transfer function's poles (i.e., the singularities where the transfer function's magnitude is unbounded). These poles can be used to analyze whether the system is asymptotically stable or marginally stable. An alternative approach to determining stability, which does not involve calculating eigenvalues, is to analyze the system's Lyapunov stability.

The zeros found in the numerator of  can similarly be used to determine whether the system is minimum phase.

The system may still be input–output stable (see BIBO stable) even though it is not internally stable. This may be the case if unstable poles are canceled out by zeros (i.e., if those singularities in the transfer function are removable).

Controllability 

The state controllability condition implies that it is possible – by admissible inputs – to steer the states from any initial value to any final value within some finite time window. A continuous time-invariant linear state-space model is controllable if and only if

where rank is the number of linearly independent rows in a matrix, and where n is the number of state variables.

Observability 

Observability is a measure for how well internal states of a system can be inferred by knowledge of its external outputs. The observability and controllability of a system are mathematical duals (i.e., as controllability provides that an input is available that brings any initial state to any desired final state, observability provides that knowing an output trajectory provides enough information to predict the initial state of the system).

A continuous time-invariant linear state-space model is observable if and only if

Transfer function 
The "transfer function" of a continuous time-invariant linear state-space model can be derived in the following way:

First, taking the Laplace transform of 

yields

and thus

giving

Assuming zero initial conditions  and a single-input single-output (SISO) system, the transfer function  is defined as the ratio of output and input . For a multiple-input multiple-output (MIMO) system, however, this ratio is not defined. Therefore, assuming zero initial conditions, the transfer function matrix is derived from

using the method of equating the coefficients which yields

.

Consequently,  is a matrix with the dimension  which contains transfer functions for each input output combination. Due to the simplicity of this matrix notation, the state-space representation is commonly used for multiple-input, multiple-output systems. The Rosenbrock system matrix provides a bridge between the state-space representation and its transfer function.

Canonical realizations 

Any given transfer function which is strictly proper can easily be transferred into state-space by the following approach (this example is for a 4-dimensional, single-input, single-output system):

Given a transfer function, expand it to reveal all coefficients in both the numerator and denominator. This should result in the following form:

The coefficients can now be inserted directly into the state-space model by the following approach:

This state-space realization is called controllable canonical form because the resulting model is guaranteed to be controllable (i.e., because the control enters a chain of integrators, it has the ability to move every state).

The transfer function coefficients can also be used to construct another type of canonical form

This state-space realization is called observable canonical form because the resulting model is guaranteed to be observable (i.e., because the output exits from a chain of integrators, every state has an effect on the output).

Proper transfer functions 
Transfer functions which are only proper (and not strictly proper) can also be realised quite easily. The trick here is to separate the transfer function into two parts: a strictly proper part and a constant. 

The strictly proper transfer function can then be transformed into a canonical state-space realization using techniques shown above. The state-space realization of the constant is trivially . Together we then get a state-space realization with matrices A, B and C determined by the strictly proper part, and matrix D determined by the constant.

Here is an example to clear things up a bit:

which yields the following controllable realization

Notice how the output also depends directly on the input. This is due to the  constant in the transfer function.

Feedback 

A common method for feedback is to multiply the output by a matrix K and setting this as the input to the system: .
Since the values of K are unrestricted the values can easily be negated for negative feedback.
The presence of a negative sign (the common notation) is merely a notational one and its absence has no impact on the end results.

 
 

becomes

 
 

 
 

This assumes that the closed-loop system is controllable or that the unstable eigenvalues of A can be made stable through appropriate choice of K.

Example 
For a strictly proper system D equals zero. Another fairly common situation is when all states are outputs, i.e. y = x, which yields C = I, the Identity matrix. This would then result in the simpler equations

 
 

This reduces the necessary eigendecomposition to just .

Feedback with setpoint (reference) input 

In addition to feedback, an input, can be added such that .

 
 

becomes

 
 

results in

 
 

One fairly common simplification to this system is removing D, which reduces the equations to

Moving object example 
A classical linear system is that of one-dimensional movement of an object (e.g., a cart).
Newton's laws of motion for an object moving horizontally on a plane and attached to a wall with a spring:

where
 is position;  is velocity;  is acceleration
 is an applied force
 is the viscous friction coefficient
 is the spring constant
 is the mass of the object

The state equation would then become

where
 represents the position of the object
 is the velocity of the object
 is the acceleration of the object
the output  is the position of the object

The controllability test is then

The observability test is then

which also has full rank. Therefore, this system is both controllable and observable.

Nonlinear systems 
The more general form of a state-space model can be written as two functions.

The first is the state equation and the latter is the output equation.
If the function  is a linear combination of states and inputs then the equations can be written in matrix notation like above.
The  argument to the functions can be dropped if the system is unforced (i.e., it has no inputs).

Pendulum example 
A classic nonlinear system is a simple unforced pendulum

where
 is the angle of the pendulum with respect to the direction of gravity
 is the mass of the pendulum (pendulum rod's mass is assumed to be zero)
 is the gravitational acceleration
 is coefficient of friction at the pivot point
 is the radius of the pendulum (to the center of gravity of the mass )
The state equations are then

where
 is the angle of the pendulum
 is the rotational velocity of the pendulum
 is the rotational acceleration of the pendulum

Instead, the state equation can be written in the general form

The equilibrium/stationary points of a system are when  and so the equilibrium points of a pendulum are those that satisfy

for integers n.

See also 

 Control engineering
 Control theory
 State observer
 Observability
 Controllability
 Discretization of state-space models
 Phase space for information about phase state (like state space) in physics and mathematics.
 State space for information about state space with discrete states in computer science.
 State space (physics) for information about state space in physics.
Kalman filter for a statistical application.

References

Further reading 

 
 
 
 
 
 
 

On the applications of state-space models in econometrics

External links 
 Wolfram language functions for linear state-space models, affine state-space models, and nonlinear state-space models.

Classical control theory
Mathematical modeling
Time domain analysis
Time series models